Wesley Koolhof (born 17 April 1989) is a Dutch professional tennis player who specialises in doubles. He achieved his career-high doubles ranking of world No. 1 in doubles on 7 November 2022. He has won 14 doubles titles on the ATP Tour, most notably the 2020 ATP Finals with Mektić, the 2022 Madrid Masters, the 2022 Canadian Open and the 2022 Paris Masters partnering Neal Skupski. He has finished runner-up at a further 19 ATP tournaments, including two times at the US Open and four at Masters 1000 level.

He won his first Grand Slam title at the 2022 French Open alongside Ena Shibahara in mixed doubles, having previously reached the men's doubles final at the 2020 US Open with Nikola Mektić. Koolhof also reached the US Open Men's Doubles Final in 2022 alongside Neal Skupski. He has also reached two further major semifinals across the two disciplines.

Koolhof made his Davis Cup debut for the Netherlands in 2019, and also competed at the 2020 Olympic Games alongside Jean-Julien Rojer.

Personal life
He is the son of the late Dutch international footballer Jurrie Koolhof.

Career

2015-16: Partnership with Middelkoop, First ATP & 11 Challengers titles
Koolhof won his maiden ATP tour doubles title at the 2016 Sofia Open on indoor hard courts in Bulgaria, partnering compatriot Matwe Middelkoop. The pair defeated Adil Shamasdin and Philipp Oswald in a third set tie-breaker 5–7, 7–6(11–9), [10–6] in the championship match to capture the title.

2017-18: New partnership with Sitak, Five ATP finals
Koolhof teamed up with New Zealand player Artem Sitak mid-year in 2017.  They reached the final at the 2017 BB&T Atlanta Open, losing to the Bryan brothers, and lost in the first round at the US Open before winning a Challenger event in Szczecin, Poland, and losing another ATP final, this time at the 2017 Moselle Open in Metz, France, to Julien Benneteau and Édouard Roger-Vasselin.

Starting the new 2018 year in Brisbane, Sitak and Koolhof lost in the semi-finals to Leonardo Mayer and Horacio Zeballos.  They lost in the first round in Auckland to Michael Venus and Raven Klaasen, and then 7–6(5), 4–6, 4–6 in the second round of the Australian Open to the eventual winners, Oliver Marach and Mate Pavić.
  
Sitak and Koolhof then went to Newport Beach in California where, as top seeds, they lost in the first round in straight sets to Treat Huey and Denis Kudla. They then lost in the quarterfinals at Montpellier before going all the way to the final in the New York Open, being beaten by Max Mirnyi and Philipp Oswald in a match tie-break.  They followed that up with a first round loss at Delray Beach to Scott Lipsky and Divij Sharan.

Their up and down season continued in Brazil, where they reached the final in São Paulo, but were beaten in straight sets by Federico Delbonis and Máximo González.  Their next stop was Irving, Texas, where they lost in the semifinals of the ATP Challenger to Alexander Peya and Philipp Petzschner.  Moving to Europe, and playing in the Alicante Challenger in Spain as preparation for the European clay court season, they won their second title together when they beat Guido Andreozzi and Ariel Behar in the final in straight sets. They lost in the first round of their next tournament in Marrakech.  In the Hungarian Open they beat the top seeds Nikola Mektic and Alexander Peya in the first round, but lost in the second to Marcin Matkowski and Sitak's former partner Nicholas Monroe.

Their next tournament was at Estoril where they went all the way to the final before losing to the British pair of Kyle Edmund and Cameron Norrie.  They then lost in the first round of the Bordeaux Challenger tournament after Sitak had been hit in the right ear by a smash from Radu Albot, and also in the first round in Geneva, the last tournament before the French Open.

At Roland Garros, Sitak and Koolhof beat Andre Begemann and Antonio Sancic in the first round, then the ninth seeds Ivan Dodig and Rajeev Ram, before going down to fifth seeds Juan Sebastian Cabal and Robert Farah.  All three matches went to a deciding set.  After the tournament was finished, it was announced that the pair would split, with Koolhof joining Sitak's fellow New Zealander, and former partner, Marcus Daniell, and Sitak linking up with Indian Divij Sharan.

2019: First Major quarterfinal with Daniell, Three Masters finals
Koolhof partnering with Stefanos Tsitsipas reached his first Masters 1000 final at the 2019 Miami Open losing to the Bryan brothers and with Robin Haase made the finals of the 2019 Monte-Carlo Masters and the 2019 Canadian Open.

At the 2019 Wimbledon Championships he reached the quarterfinals partnering Marcus Daniell in doubles and the semifinals in mixed doubles with Květa Peschke.

2020: ATP Finals title & US Open final with Mektic, World No. 5
2020 was the most successful year for Koolhof in his career thus far. He won the 2020 ATP Finals in doubles partnering Nikola Mektić. He also reached the doubles semifinal of the 2020 French Open and the final at the 2020 US Open partnering again with Nikola Mektić. As a result he finished the year at world No. 5 in the top 10 rankings in doubles and No. 3 in the doubles race with his partner Nikola Mektić.

2021: Seventh title, Second mixed doubles semifinal, Olympics debut 
In May, Koolhof won his seventh title at the 2021 Bavarian Championships with Kevin Krawietz. He also reached his 7th and 8th consecutive Masters 1000 quarterfinals at the 2021 Mutua Madrid Open with Łukasz Kubot and at the 2021 Italian Open with compatriot Jean-Julien Rojer.

2022: Partnership with Skupski, Four ATP & Three Masters & mixed doubles titles, World No. 1
Partnering with Neal Skupski he won two ATP 250 titles during the Australian Summer swing, before the 2022 Australian Open. The pair reached the quarterfinals at the first Grand Slam of the year for the first time at this Major. They won their third title at the 2022 Qatar ExxonMobil Open dropping only one set en route to the final where they defeated Rohan Bopanna and Denis Shapovalov in straight sets. He reached the final of the 2022 Miami Open with Skupski where they lost to John Isner and Hubert Hurkacz.

Seeded seventh, they reached their second Masters 1000 final at the 2022 Mutua Madrid Open after defeating John Isner and Hubert Hurkacz. In the final they defeated fifth seeds Robert Farah and Juan Sebastián Cabal to win their first Masters 1000 title in their career and as a pair. As a result Koolhof returned to the top 10 in the rankings on 9 May 2022.

At the 2022 French Open he won his first Grand Slam title in mixed doubles in his career partnering Ena Shibahara.
He also reached the quarterfinals with Skupski for the second time at this Major defeating unseeded pair of Americans Tommy Paul and Mackenzie McDonald.  

He reached a new career high doubles ranking of World No. 4 on 8 August at the start of the 2022 National Bank Open where he reached with Skupski the semifinals of a Masters 1000 for the third time in the season defeating Lloyd Glasspool/Harri Heliövaara. Next the pair advanced to the eight final of the season defeating Krawietz/Mies. They won their sixth title defeating Dan Evans (tennis) and John Peers (tennis).
As a result he moved to world No. 3 in the doubles rankings on 15 August 2022.

Seeded 2nd at the US Open the pair reached the quarterfinals defeating Wimbledon champions Australian pair of Ebden/Purcell in three sets. Next they defeated Marcelo Demoliner and Joao Sousa to reach the semifinals. They reached the finals after defeating Marcelo Arevalo and Jean-Julien Rojer in the semifinals for a chance to become World No. 1. In the finals, they lost in straight sets to Rajeev Ram and Joe Salisbury. At the 2022 Rolex Paris Masters the pair Koolhof/Skupski reached the semifinals defeating ninth seeds Rohan Bopanna/Matwe Middelkoop climbing to World No. 1 and World No. 2 respectively, and solidifying the No. 1 position as a pair in the doubles race. They reached their 10th final and fourth at a Masters level for the season defeating seventh seeds Lloyd Glasspool /Harri Heliövaara. They won their third Masters title and seventh for the season defeating eight seeds Ivan Dodig/Austin Krajicek in the final. They also clinched the No. 1 year-end ranking as a team.

Significant finals

Grand Slam tournament finals

Doubles: 2 (2 runner-ups)

Mixed doubles: 1 (title)

Year-end championships

Doubles: 1 (1 title)

Masters 1000

Doubles: 8 (3 titles, 5 runner-ups)

ATP career finals

Doubles: 34 (14 titles, 20 runner-ups)

ATP Challenger Tour titles

Doubles: 14

Doubles performance timeline 

Current through the 2022 US Open.

References

External links
 
 

1989 births
Living people
Dutch male tennis players
People from Zevenaar
Olympic tennis players of the Netherlands
Tennis players at the 2020 Summer Olympics
French Open champions
Grand Slam (tennis) champions in mixed doubles
Sportspeople from Gelderland
21st-century Dutch people
ATP number 1 ranked doubles tennis players